Louis John Cole (born 28 April 1983), better known by his original online alias FoodForLouis, then later rebranding as FunForLouis is an English-born film-maker and YouTube personality based in San Mateo, Costa Rica. He has a following of over 2 million on YouTube and is best known for posting a daily video blog on the channel FunForLouis, which documents his life and travels adventuring all over the globe. Cole originally found fame through filming eating stunts on another channel, FoodForLouis, but has since taken these videos down to focus on the positive message of FunForLouis. Cole has been named a top travel influencer by Forbes.

Early life, family and education

Siblings -  Darcy Cole, Hilary Cole

Louis attended Sixth Form College and completed most of his A-Levels achieving an A in Graphic Design, B In Fine Art , C In IT, but was sadly kicked off of his biology course due to falling asleep constantly In class.

Louis appeared on the BBC TV show, Homefront, when he was younger.

Projects
In 2007 Cole purchased and renovated a double-decker bus, equipping it as a mobile centre to help homeless youth with music and video game facilities. The Boombus project now receives funding from local council wards.

He has released over 1486 vlogs consecutively as of 25 October 2017. Through this, Cole has managed to gain over 1.92 million subscribers as of 28 May 2017.

Discovery signed Cole to its Digital Seeker Network in 2015.

In 2019, Louis restarted his FoodForLouis as a Vegan cooking channel. He created a social media travel management agency brand based on his slogan Live The Adventure, often referred to as LTA. Find The Nomads was a clothing company founded by Cole, Steve Booker and Jake Evans. It was started on 9 May 2014 and was dissolved on 28 June 2016.

Beyond Borders involved flying to 22 cities with his friend and pilot Juan-Peter "JP" Schulze over a period of 60–90 days. The journey began in Kern Valley, California, US, on 21 August 2017.  The journey has been concluded and the film documenting the trip can be found on discovery+

In 2016, Louis co-founded The Solvey Project with Dave Erasmus with the aim of funding social entrepreneurs.

Louis and Dave presented on stage at Social Progress - What Works? in Reykjavik, Iceland with then Prime Minister Sigurður Ingi Jóhannsson.

On 22 March 2017, Cole announced on his YouTube channel that he is starting a Kickstarter campaign to fund Beyond Borders - A Film Celebrating Unity, a documentary about flying around the world with JP. The £100,000 goal was reached before the kickstarter ended with a total amount of £111,563 raised by 1,666 backers. The film was released in 2021 on Discovery+.

Controversy

2012 
In April 2012 he posted a video of himself to his YouTube channel Food For Louis that showed him eating a live goldfish. This caused the RSPCA to prepare a case against him under the Animal Welfare Act 2006. Since he had previously only eaten invertebrates, the fish was the first incident in which he may have broken the law. The case was settled: he admitted his guilt and received a caution, avoiding a trial and a possible criminal record. He has received death threats from some animal lovers.

In the past, Cole has eaten locusts, a raw heart, maggots, roadkill rabbit, roadkill pigeon, a frog corpse, ragworms, and scorpions.

Cole claims his videos are not cruel and that he kills the animals quickly to avoid any unnecessary suffering. He argues that viewers' disgust is based on ignorance of or bias against other culinary cultures. He has denied that his goldfish-eating stunt caused unnecessary suffering, and claims that the RSPCA is "wasting its time" in pursuing the case.

2016 
At the beginning of 2016 while driving in New Zealand with his girlfriend Raya, he was pulled over for speeding 41 km/h over the speed limit. While the officer caught him travelling at 141 km/h (87 mph), he used discretion to officially register it as 139 km/h. Since he was registered under 40 km/h over the limit, under New Zealand law Cole received a NZD$400 fine instead of automatic loss of licence. The story made national headlines in New Zealand.

In August 2016, Cole was criticized for his vlogs from his visit to North Korea. He was accused of promoting North Korea and his videos were described as propaganda for the North Korean regime. He has stated that he disagrees with the ideology of the regime and that the content was not funded by the North Korean government.

References

External links
Spangler, Todd (5 May 2015). "NewFronts 2015: Discovery Taps YouTube Travel Vlogger Louis Cole, TLC Launches Digital-Video Site". Variety.
James, Richard (10 December 2013). "Man creates amazing video of his year abroad, internet dreams of packing it all in and joining him". Metro.

Living people
1983 births
English video bloggers
English YouTubers
English Christians
YouTube vloggers